Forrest is a village in Livingston County, Illinois, United States. The population was 1,220 at the 2010 census.

Geography

Forrest is located in southeastern Livingston County at  (40.750018, -88.409992). It is in the northern part of Forrest Township, with a small area extending north into Pleasant Ridge Township.

U.S. Route 24 (Wabash Avenue) passes through the village, leading east  to Interstate 57 at Gilman and west  to Interstate 55 at Chenoa. Illinois Route 47 (Center Street) crosses US 24 near the village center; it leads north  to Dwight and south  to Gibson City.

History

Founding and naming 

Forrest was laid out on December 11, 1866, by Israel J. Krack (1816 – 1900). Krack was born in Baltimore, Maryland. Both of his parents had come from Germany. He was briefly a teacher, lived in Indiana, and came to Livingston County in 1854. Krack was a farmer, notary public, grain dealer, and in later life an insurance agent. Krack was elected to the Illinois General Assembly in 1872 and became treasurer of Livingston County in 1878. Krack Street, which parallels the railroad, was named for the town's founder. When Forrest was established, the Toledo, Peoria and Western Railroad had already been in operation for almost ten years, and therefore the origin of the town is unlike Fairbury, Chatsworth, Chenoa, Gridley and  El Paso, all of which were founded when the railroad was first built. Within a few years of its founding, the people of Forrest did not know the full name of the person for whom the town was named. The author of the 1878 History of Livingston County says only two things about Mr. Forrest: he was a business partner of C. L. Frost, an official of the Toledo, Peoria and Western, and that he had promised to do something for the young village and that promise was "unfulfilled". The first version of the name was said to be "Forestville", spelled with one "r", but the "Forrest" spelling quickly came into use. Forrest Township was created soon after the village was founded and took its name from the village.

Design and commerce 

In 1861 or 1862, before the town was platted, Israel J. Krack was operating a grain elevator at the location. Like most towns of the period, the plan of the original town of Forrest was centered on a long narrow depot grounds, which were on the north side of the tracks. The plat was for a simple grid of twenty blocks. The first house in Forrest was built by Mr. Krack, who was also the first postmaster and the first station agent. He also laid out many additions to the town. The first hotel was built by William Umberfield and was known as the Forrest House. The first mill was built by R. B. Wilson. The first church was built by the Methodists in 1868. The town grew rapidly and by 1890 had over 1,000 people. Forrest, like almost every other early town of central Illinois during this period, was built from inexpensive pine lumber brought in by the railroad from Michigan or Wisconsin. In the winter of 1868-1869 much of the business district, including one grain warehouse, was burned. It was quickly rebuilt. This was the first of many fires that plagued the new town. In 1890 a particularly devastating blaze destroyed much of downtown Forrest. Rebuilding was rapid, and by 1893 there were five hotels.

Introduction of the Wabash Railroad 

The people of Forrest worked to attract a second railroad. At first there were hopes that the Chicago and Paducah Railroad could be induced to construct its tracks through the town, but this road was diverted to nearby Fairbury. Success came when the Wabash Railroad was constructed through Forrest in 1880. On May 1 of that year, the first train on the Wabash passed through Forrest. The village became an important stopping place on the Wabash line linking Chicago and Kansas City. Soon repair shops were built, and by the early 1890s over sixty men were employed here. The town became a freight shipment point for the Chicago Division of the railroad. In 1894 local workers supported a strike against the Wabash, and many of those who had supported the strike lost their jobs to strikebreakers. The Freight Division was removed to Decatur. Between 1914 and 1921 it was briefly returned to Forrest. By the 1920s the days of Forrest as a railroad center began to fade. In 1924 the state of Illinois began construction on a paved road that eventually became Route 24.

Historical landmarks

In the Railroad Park at Forrest are several important railroad-related remains. A surviving railroad turntable is located here. The turntable was re-painted in 2017. The park also contains the former Wabash Railroad station and a restored Norfolk & Western Railroad caboose. The Wabash Railroad station is now a museum, and contains a scale model of the town as it was in its railroad heyday. The model includes a fully functional turntable and electric railroad track. The museum also contains many artifacts from the early 1900s.

Demographics

Per the 2010 United States Census, Forrest had 1,220 people.  Among non-Hispanics this includes 1,135 White (93.0%), 5 Black (0.4%), 2 Asian (0.2%), & 2 from two or more races.  The Hispanic or Latino population included 75 people (6.1%).

There were 469 households, out of which 33.0% had children under the age of 18 living with them, 53.9% were married couples living together, 3.4% had a female householder with children & no husband present, and 32.8% were non-families. 27.7% of all households were made up of individuals, and 28.6% had someone who was 65 years of age or older.

The population had 74.0% over the age of 18 and 14.8% who were 65 years of age or older. The median age was 35.9 years. The gender ratio was 49.8% male & 50.2% female.  Among 469 occupied households, 73.1% were owner-occupied & 26.9% were renter-occupied.

As of the census of 2000, there were 1,225 people, 470 households, and 344 families residing in the village. The racial makeup of the village was 96.33% White, 0.57% African American, 0.57% Native American, 0.16% Asian, 1.31% from other races, and 1.06% from two or more races. Hispanic or Latino of any race were 2.69% of the population.

There were 470 households, out of which 34.3% had children under the age of 18 living with them, 61.7% were married couples living together, 8.1% had a female householder with no husband present, and 26.8% were non-families. 24.7% of all households were made up of individuals, and 12.8% had someone living alone who was 65 years of age or older. The average household size was 2.61 and the average family size was 3.13.

In the village, the population was spread, with 29.7% under the age of 18, 6.3% from 18 to 24, 26.8% from 25 to 44, 20.3% from 45 to 64, and 16.9% who were 65 years of age or older. The median age was 37 years. For every 100 females, there were 97.3 males. For every 100 females age 18 and over, there were 91.8 males.

The median income for a household in the village was $40,677, and the median income for a family was $45,938. Males had a median income of $37,868 versus $20,694 for females. The per capita income for the village was $17,707. About 5.8% of families and 8.9% of the population were below the poverty line, including 14.3% of those under age 18 and 3.0% of those age 65 or over.

References

External links
Official website

Villages in Illinois
Villages in Livingston County, Illinois
Populated places established in 1866
1866 establishments in Illinois